Chinese Russian or Russian Chinese may refer to:

Sino-Russian relations (c.f. "a Chinese-Russian treaty")

Language
Kyakhta Russian-Chinese Pidgin
Russian methods for writing the Chinese language:
Cyrillization of Chinese
Latinxua Sin Wenz
Dungan language, a Sinitic language spoken in Russia by the Dungan people

People and ethnic groups
Ethnic Chinese in Russia
Dungan people, descendants of Hui from China who migrated to the Russian Empire
Ethnic Russians in China
Harbin Russians
Shanghai Russians
Russians in Hong Kong
Albazin Cossacks, Russian soldiers captured by Qing dynasty forces in 1685 and resettled near Beijing
Eurasian (mixed ancestry) people of mixed Chinese and Russian descent
People with dual citizenship of China and Russia

See also
Chinese Soviet (disambiguation)